Jan Hájek was the defending champion, but decided not to participate.
Andrey Golubev defeated Diego Sebastián Schwartzman in the final 6–1 6–3.

Seeds

Draw

Finals

Top half

Bottom half

References
 Main Draw
 Qualifying Draw

Marburg Openandnbsp;- Singles
2013 Singles